The Catholic Building Society was a UK building society based in Westminster, London. It was the 57th largest in the United Kingdom based on total assets of £44 million at 31 December 2007. The Society was started by Vincent Byrne and the Hon. Nona Byrne, in 1960.

The Society started at 49 Harrington Road, Kensington; in 1966 it moved to Great Peter Street, Westminster, sharing the Westminster diocesan offices, under the patronage of Canon Adrian Arrowsmith. From 1972, the Society was based in Strutton Ground, moving between buildings on that street until settling at 7 Strutton Ground in 1993.

It prided itself on making affordable home loans available to people with lower than average incomes, giving a high proportion of its home loans to single women.

Vincent Byrne retired from the Society in 1967, remaining as Honorary President until his death, aged 70, in 1978. He was succeeded by the Duke of Norfolk and subsequently by Nona Byrne.

The Catholic Building Society and Chelsea Building Society merged in December 2008 under the Chelsea name. The Chelsea merged with the Yorkshire Building Society in April 2010.

On 5 July 2014, a firm called the Fair Investment Company of Bristol was advertising cash ISAs on behalf of the Catholic Building Society, in the form of a structured product related to the performance of the FTSE index.

External links
Catholic Building Society
Building Societies Association
 KPMG Building Societies Database 2008

References

Banks established in 1960
Organisations based in the City of Westminster
Organizations established in 1960
1960 establishments in England